Queen Gyeongsun of the Munju Park clan was the first wife of Dojo of Joseon and the mother of Hwanjo of Joseon. She was also the biological grandmother of Taejo of Joseon, the founder of the Joseon Dynasty.

Biography
Lady Park was born as the daughter of a Yuan dynasty's Cheonho (천호, 千戶), Park Gwang, Internal Prince Anbyeon (박광 안변부원군). She later married Yi Chun and had 5 sons, and 2 daughters. After her death, instead of remarrying, her husband had Lady Jo (조씨), the daughter of Jo Yang-Gi (조양기), become his concubine. In 28 July 1392, when her grandson, Yi Seong-Gye (이성계) established the new dynasty, the Joseon Dynasty. As the grandmother of the king, Lady Park was given royal title of Gyeongbi (경비, 敬妣; literally: Queen Gyeong or Consort Gyeong) and later on 22 April 1411, her great-grandson, Taejong of Joseon, gave her a posthumous name Queen Gyeongsun (경순왕후, 敬順王后). Her tomb was located in Sulleung, Heungnam-si, Hangyeongnam-do.

Family
Father: Park Gwang, Internal Prince Anbyeon (박광 안변부원군)
Grandfather: Park Tong (박통, 朴通)
Husband: Dojo of Joseon (조선 도조) (? - 1342)
Father-in-law: Ikjo of Joseon (조선 익조)
Mother-in-law: Queen Jeongsuk of the Yeongheung Choi clan (정숙왕후 최씨)
 Issue
 Son: Yi Ja-heung, Grand Prince Wanchang (이자흥 완창대군) (1305 - ?) – Sino-Korean Mongolia name was Yitapsabulhwa (이탑사불화, 李塔思不花)
Daughter-in-law: Lady Jo of the Hanyang Jo clan (한양 조씨)
Grandson: Yi Gyo-ju (이교주)
Grandson: Yi Jong-ryong, Prince Unseong (이종룡 운성군)
 Adoptive grandson: Yi Cheon-gye, Grand Prince Yeongseong (영성대군 이천계) (1333 - 1392); second son of King Hwangjo 
Son: Yi Ja-chun, Hwanjo of Joseon (이자춘 조선 환조)
Daughter-in-law: Queen Uihye of the Yeongheung Choi clan (의혜왕후 최씨)
Grandson: Taejo of Joseon (27 October 1335 - 18 June 1408) (조선 태조왕)
Granddaughter-in-law: Queen Shinui of the Anbyeon Han clan (September 1337 - 21 October 1391) (신의왕후 한씨)
Granddaughter-in-law: Queen Sindeok of the Goksan Kang clan (12 July 1356 - 15 September 1396) (신덕왕후 강씨)
Granddaughter: Princess Jeonghwa (정화공주)
Grandson-in-law: Jo In-byeok, Internal Prince Yongwon (1328 - 1393) (조인벽 용원부원군)
 Son: Yi Ja-seon, Prince Wanwon (완원대군 이자선) (1331 - 1356)
 Daughter-in-law: Lady Wang of the Kaeseong Wang clan (개성 왕씨)
 Grandson: Yi Won, Prince Gaeheung (개흥군 이원)
 Grandson: Yi Ji, Prince Gaeryeong (개령군 이지)
 Grandson: Yi Mae, Prince Gaewon (개원군 이매)
 Son: Yi Pyeong, Prince Wancheon (완천대군 이평)
 Daughter-in-law: Lady Han of the Cheongju Han clan (청주 한씨); daughter of Han Hyeong (한형, 韓珩)
 Son: Yi Jung, Prince Wanseong (완성대군 이종) (1320 - 1385)
 Daughter-in-law: Lady Han of the Cheongju Han clan (청주 한씨); daughter of Han Jun (한준, 韓俊)
 Grandson: Yi Hwa-sang, Prince Yeongchun (영춘군 이화상) (1350 - 1405)
 Daughter: Princess Munhye (문혜공주)
 Son-in-law: Mun In-yeong, Prince Daejang (대장군 문인영, 文仁永)
 Daughter: Princess Munsuk (문숙공주)
 Son-in-law: Kim Ma-bun (김마분, 金馬紛)
 Daughter: Princess Munui (문의공주)
 Son-in-law: Heo Jung (허중,?許重)

References

Royal consorts of the Joseon dynasty
Korean queens consort
14th-century Korean people
Year of birth unknown
Year of death unknown
Date of birth unknown
Date of death unknown